Bolshiye Ugony is a rural locality and the administrative center of Bolsheugonsky Selsoviet Rural Settlement, Lgovsky District, Kursk Oblast, Russia. Population:

Geography 
The village is located on the Seym River, 46 km from the Russia–Ukraine border, 55 km south-west of Kursk, 12 km south-east of the district center – the town Lgov.

 Climate
Bolshiye Ugony has a warm-summer humid continental climate (Dfb in the Köppen climate classification).

Transport 
There is a railway halt 408 km (railway line Lgov I — Kursk).

The rural locality is situated 62 km from Kursk Vostochny Airport, 132 km from Belgorod International Airport and 264 km from Voronezh Peter the Great Airport.

References

Notes

Sources

Rural localities in Lgovsky District
Lgovsky Uyezd